The North Union Railway was an early British railway company, operating in Lancashire. It was created in 1834, continuing independently until 1889.

Formation
The North Union Railway (NUR) was created by an Act of Parliament on 22 May 1834 which authorised its founding as the first-ever railway amalgamation. The two companies amalgamated were the Wigan Branch Railway and the Preston and Wigan Railway. The Preston and Wigan Railway had the Act authorising it to construct the railway in place but was underfunded and sought the amalgamation to help gets its railway under way. The first chairman of the company was Sir Thomas Dalrymple Hesketh, Bart. He had previously held the same position at the Preston and Wigan Railway.

Construction
When it was created, the North Union Railway consisted of the line constructed by the Wigan Branch Railway (WBR) but little else. All its locomotives and rolling stock were supplied by the Liverpool and Manchester Railway.

Within a month the railway appointed Charles Vignoles as engineer on the railway at a salary of £1,200 (equivalent to £ in ).

Work was started on the construction of the Wigan to Preston section of the railway. As Preston stands upon a ridge rising sharply from the north bank of the River Ribble reaching it involved some engineering, the North Union reached its terminus by descending gradients as steep as 1 in 100 to the valley, crossing the river and cutting into the rising ground as far as Fishergate. The river bridge was of five arches, each spanning 120 ft. The line was completed in 1838 and a trial run was held on 22 October with a train running from Wigan to Preston, and the line opened to the public on 31 October 1838.

The colliery line known as Springs Branch that had been authorised at the same time as WBR was opened on the same day, 31 October 1838.

In 1846, in conjunction with the Ribble Navigation Company, the North Union obtained powers to build a branch to Victoria Quay on the River Ribble. This line was built to convey coal from the Wigan district to the river for shipment.

The L&NWR continued to improve the route and in 1864 installed the Winwick cut-off between Golborne junction and Winwick junction (on the former Warrington and Newton Railway) which provided a route for trains to avoid Lowton, Parkside and Earlestown junctions.

Stations
The NUR opened the Wigan to Preston section with the following stations:
Wigan Chapel Lane station was closed on the same day as the opening of the Wigan to Preston section of the railway on 31 October 1838. It was replaced by the slightly further north Wigan station. This station became Wigan North Western on 2 June 1924. 
 which was closed on 31 January 1949 (this station was adjacent to the Lancashire Union railway's Boar's Head station). 
Standish Lane station which was renamed Standish by 1844 and was closed on 23 May 1949. 
 which was closed on 6 October 1969.
Euxton which was closed on 2 September 1895.  
Golden Hill which was renamed  in 1838 and is still open.
 which was renamed Farington in October 1857 and closed on 7 March 1960.
Preston Fishergate which was renamed Preston at an unknown date. The evolution of Preston station and the railways of the area was complicated, further information is available in the Preston railway station article.

Bolton to Preston

The North Union Railway was concerned to protect its interests and had many disagreements with rival railways and canals.
The North Union Railway opposed the proposed Bolton and Preston Railway (B&PR), whose original Act of 15 July 1837 made for an independent route through to Preston. A further Act of 4 July 1838 was enacted withdrawing the B&PRs powers to build beyond Chorley and instead authorised an extension to join the North Union Railway's line at Euxton, north of Chorley.

The Bolton & Preston Act was passed with the proviso that the line north of Chorley should be delayed for three years so that a compromise could be reached between the two companies about running trains into Preston. 

There was immediate competition between the two companies for the Manchester to Preston traffic and they tried to undercut each other's fares. The North Union managed to maintain the upper hand in the competition as they were able to extract tolls from its rival for running trains along its Euxton to Preston stretch. 

The rivalry was short-lived as the Bolton & Preston Railway was acquired by the North Union Railway by an Act of 10 May 1844.

Operations
In 1834 the Wigan Branch Railway had offered John Hargreaves, an established carrier in the North West, the lease for operating the goods service on their line. Hargreaves, in partnership with his son (also called John Hargreaves) declined the offer and made a counter offer which was accepted by the new North Union Railway, as this was now after the merger of the railways. The son, John Hargreaves junior therefore became the sole lessee over the Wigan section for goods traffic with the exception of those who already had the right to operate their own trains, mainly coal mine owners. The L&MR continued to provide all the passenger services for the line.

When the first section of the Bolton to Preston line opened on 4 Feb 1841 it met the Manchester, Bolton and Bury Railway (MB&BR) coming up from Salford which had opened on 29 May 1838. This railway was built by the Manchester, Bolton and Bury Canal Navigation and Railway Company who had in 1831 converted from a canal company. Their railway terminated at Bolton Trinity Street station and part of the enabling Act for the Preston to Bolton section made provision for the station to be converted to a through station to allow for traffic to Preston.

In the same way as the L&MR provided operational services to the WBR and NUR over the Parkside to Wigan section, so the MB&BR provided operational services to the NUR over the Bolton to Preston Section.

In 1846 arrangements were being made for the line to be leased jointly to the Grand Junction Railway (GJR) and the Manchester and Leeds Railway (M&LR) but before this happened the GJR became part of the London and North Western Railway (L&NWR), the arrangement continued however with the L&NWR and the M&LR jointly leasing the NUR.

On 9 July 1847 the Manchester & Leeds Railway changed its title to the Lancashire and Yorkshire Railway (L&Y) but the leasing arrangement continued. The NUR continued independently under this leasing arrangement with the L&NWR owning  and the L&YR . This was the situation until 26 July 1889 when it was jointly absorbed by the L&NWR and L&YR.

The NUR was absorbed by the two larger companies by the simple expedient of the section from Euxton to Bolton (the former B&PR) being taken by the L&YR and the section from Parkside to Euxton going to the L&NWR.

Accidents and incidents
On 28 June 1847, the boiler of a locomotive exploded, injuring one person.

Later years
To cope with ever-increasing traffic, the line was quadrupled between 1889 and 1891.

The stretch between Euxton Junction and Preston, which included the major part of Preston station, remained in joint ownership up to 1921 when the L&YR was absorbed by the L&NWR so from that date the former North Union Railway had only one owner. This section had been the only part of the West Coast Main Line between London Euston and Carlisle not wholly owned by the L&NWR.

Balshaw Lane and Euxton station was opened by the L&NWR on 2 September 1905, it closed on 6 October 1969.  Services restarted from this station now named Euxton Balshaw Lane on 15 December 1997.

Notes

References

Further reading

External links
 

Early British railway companies
Historic transport in Lancashire
Rail transport in Lancashire
History of Preston
History of the Metropolitan Borough of Wigan
Railway companies established in 1834
Railway lines opened in 1838
1834 establishments in the United Kingdom
British companies established in 1834